Manitoba Advanced Education, Skills and Immigration (formerly the Department of Advanced Education and Literacy) is the department of the Government of Manitoba responsible for supporting adult learning, post-secondary education, and vocational training in Manitoba.

The Department is overseen by the Minister of Advanced Education and Training, who is Sarah Guillemard, as of 30 January 2023.

Overview 
In the 2011-2012 Annual Report, the department's stated goal was:

 
The listed acts provide the structure under which the department has operated: 
The Adult Learning Centres Act
The Adult Literacy Act
The Advanced Education Administration Act
The Brandon University Act
The Colleges Act
The Université de Saint-Boniface Act
The Council on Post-Secondary Education Act
The Degree Granting Act
The Private Vocational Institutions Act
The Student Aid Act
The University College of the North Act
The University of Manitoba Act
The University of Winnipeg Act
The 2021 mandate of the Minister of Advanced Education, Skills and Immigration is to promote access to advanced education opportunities for Manitobans through strong, competitive post-secondary universities and colleges providing the quality education and skills development for today’s and tomorrow’s workforce, and that supports new economic and social opportunities for Manitoba graduates and immigrants.

History

20th century 
In 1957, the Directorate of Vocational Education was established under the Department of Education with the responsibility of the administration and coordination of vocational education in Manitoba for both high schools and post-secondary institutions. In 1961, the Brandon Vocational Training Centre (now Assiniboine Community College) opened; followed by the Manitoba Institute of Technology (now Red River College) in 1962. In 1965, construction began for the Northern Manitoba Vocational Centre (now University College of the North) in The Pas. As the community colleges were established and grew, the Directorate focused its resources on planning, construction, and program development for these institutions.

Succeeding the Directorate of Vocational Education in 1968 was the Youth and Manpower Division of the Department of Youth and Education. The creation of this new division reflected the increasing need for technical training in Manitoba as labour demands of the economy grew. The Division's mandate was to provide information and resources to assist the development of youth and manpower initiatives in the province, primarily through the operation of the province's three community colleges: Assiniboine Community College (in Brandon), Keewatin Community College (The Pas), and Red River College (Winnipeg). The expansion of these colleges, and their increasing role in provincial labour development, led to the division being renamed in 1970 to the Community Colleges Division.

Under the terms of the Universities Establishment Act of 1966, Manitoba's Associate Deputy Minister of Education was given additional responsibilities for University Affairs. In 1967, Brandon College became Brandon University and United College became the University of Winnipeg. That year, the University Grants Commission, which disbursed financial support to these institutions (as well as to the University of Manitoba), was established. University Affairs provided administrative support to the  Commission and was responsible for the administration of student financial assistance. Responsibility for student financial assistance, however, would be transferred to the Education Department's Directorate of Instruction and Supervisory Services (now known as Field Services Branch) in 1969.

In 1971, the Department of Colleges and Universities Affairs was created by an order-in-council under the Executive Government Organization Act, and assumed all functions of University Affairs. The Department also assumed jurisdiction for the Community Colleges Division of the former Department of Youth and Education, and for 2 new divisions: the Youth Secretariat and the Special Projects Division. The latter administered the Manitoba New Careers Program, Inter-Universities Exchange Program, Special Mature Students Program, and the Indian Métis Project for Careers Through Teacher Education (IMPACTE) at Brandon University. From 1971 through 1975, the Minister of the Department of Colleges and Universities Affairs was also the Minister of the Department of Education.

In 1976, the Department of Continuing Education and Manpower assumed the functions of the Department of Colleges and Universities Affairs, taking on the responsibility for post-secondary education and labour training in Manitoba. The name of this department would reflect the expanded cooperation between the federal and provincial governments regarding labour and 'manpower'. During the 1977/78 fiscal year, the functions of the Department were reintegrated with those of the Department of Education.

In 1978, the Community Colleges Division, which belonged to the Department of Colleges and Universities Affairs at the time, once again became a division within the Department of Education. In 1982, it was replaced by the new Post-Secondary, Adult and Continuing Education Division. This new division also integrated branches from the former Program Development and Support Services Division.

In April 1978, the Education Department merged with the Department of Continuing Education and Manpower to form one restructured organization, the Department of Education, that would be responsible for both the public school system and the post-secondary education system in Manitoba. Accordingly, the administrative resources of the two departments were also combined. The new Department of Education would additionally have divisions including the Community Colleges Division, which was responsible for administration of Manitoba's three community colleges; and the Manpower Division, which would later be transferred to the Department of Labour in 1978. This Department of Education would last until 1988.

In 1989, the Manitoba Literacy Office was created and became part of the Post-Secondary, Adult and Continuing Education Division. The following year, the Division was renamed Post-Secondary, Adult and Continuing Education and Training, adopting the creation of a new branch to implement a skills training strategy called WORKFORCE 2000. This strategy would be mandated to promote private-sector involvement in Manitoba's human resource development and workplace training.

Also in 1989, the Department of Education and Training assumed the functions of the former Department of Education, as well as the functions of the Department of Employment Services and Economic Security related to the development and delivery of training programs.

In 1993, the Post-Secondary, Adult and Continuing Education Division would undergo a major reorganization to consolidate skills training initiatives from across the provincial government. Assuming the divisions functions would be the Training and Continuing Education Division, under which skills-training initiatives were consolidated, as the Division also took on the functions of the former Employability Enhancement and Youth Programs units within the Department of Family Services, as well as assuming jurisdiction over the Department of Labour's Apprenticeship Branch. Through its various branches, the Division was responsible for: "literacy and continuing education programs; workplace-based trade skills and essential skills training; cooperation with private industry in developing training initiatives; administering funding to Manitoba's community colleges; and improving access to training and education for those excluded by location, economic factors, or lack of prior education or experience." With the signing of the Canada-Manitoba Labour Market Development Agreement in 1997, the Division was reorganized and its branches assumed responsibilities previously held in Manitoba by the federal government, including: employment insurance-funded employment and training programs; labour market programming; and employment counseling.

In 1994, a second deputy minister was added to the Department of Education and Training and given responsibility for training and advanced education. In 1999, this position was dissolved as part of the transfer of education functions from the Department of Education and Training to the Departments of Education, Training and Youth and of Advanced Education.

21st century 
In April 2000, the Department of Education, Training and Youth assumed the functions of the Department of Education and Training, followed by the creation of the Department of Advanced Education in January 2001. The two departments, each with its own Minister, shared a single administrative structure and deputy minister, as well as sharing a Training and Continuing Education Division, Administration and Finance Division, Bureau de l'éducation française, and the School Programs Division.

In 2003, the Department of Education, Training and Youth and the Department of Advanced Education were reorganized, establishing the Department of Education and Youth and the Department of Advanced Education and Training. Each department had its own administrative structure, although they still shared a deputy minister as well as the Administration and Finance Division until 2006. The Department of Advanced Education and Training took on the functions related to post-secondary institutions and to skills development and training programs. The Department of Advanced Education and Training was mandated under numerous Provincial Acts to administer, set priorities, allocate funds, and provide policy direction to the province's post-secondary and skills-training institutions, including the Universities of Manitoba, Winnipeg, and Brandon, the Collège universitaire de Saint-Boniface, Red River College, Assiniboine College, and Keewatin Community College (as well as its successor).

The Department of Education transferred the responsibility for vocational education and skills training to Advanced Education and Training. Some time in 2006 and 2007, however, the functions of the Department were split between:

 the Department of Advanced Education and Literacy, which assumed the functions related to adult learning and literacy, post-secondary education, student financial aid, and vocational education in a school or institutional setting.
 the Ministry of Competitiveness, Training and Trade, which assumed the functions related to vocational education and skills-training in a workplace or industrial setting.

Between 2009 and 2011, Manitoba Education shared various services with Advanced Education and Literacy, including a Financial and Administrative Services branch, the Aboriginal Education Directorate, a Systems and Technology/Innovative Technology branch, and a Human Resource Services branch.

On 18 October 2013, Manitoba Education merged with the Department of Advanced Education and Literacy to form the Department of Education and Advanced Learning, under Minister James Allum. Other responsibilities of Advanced Education and Literacy were divided with the Minister of Multiculturalism and Literacy. Alum was replaced by Peter Bjornson on 3 November 2014, but returned to the office and served until 3 May 2016, when the Department of Advanced Education and Literacy was dissolved.

The Manitoba cabinet was reorganized after the provincial general election of 2016, and the Department's responsibilities formed part of the new Education and Training portfolio under the direction of Ian Wishart. In 2021, the Pallister government introduced the new Department of Advanced Education, Skills and Immigration, under the control of Wayne Ewasko.

Minister of Advanced Education and Training 
The Minister of Advanced Education and Training is the cabinet minister responsible for Department of Advanced Education and Training.

From 1971 through 1975, the Minister of the Department of Colleges and Universities Affairs was also the Minister of the Department of Education. Diane McGifford served as the first minister of the new "Minister of Advanced Education and Training" portfolio from 21 September 2006 to 28 March 2011.

See also

 Minister of Education (Manitoba)
 Provincial Nominee Program
 Minister of Labour (Canada)
 Minister of Immigration, Refugees and Citizenship (Canada)
 Alberta Advanced Education
 Ministry of Education (Ontario)

References

Notes

External links
Manitoba Education and Advanced Learning Annual Reports

Manitoba government departments and agencies
Education in Manitoba
Immigration to Manitoba
Manitoba Advanced_Education_and_Literacy
Manitoba